Chonopeltis is a genus of fish lice in the subclass Branchiura. These crustaceans are ectoparasitic and spend most of their lives on the body of an aquatic host. Species of this genus are found exclusively in Africa, and inhabit freshwater rivers.

Description
Members of this genus do not grow any larger than a few millimetres in size. They have flat bodies covered by a carapace, and have two large suction cups, one on either side their heads. They use these suction cups to stick to their hosts.
They feed on the host‘s various assets, including mucus, internal fluids and sloughed-off scales.

Life cycle
Their larvae live and grow on their host‘s body, and mating occurs on the body of the host. Chonopeltis species will not leave the host during the egg-laying process, as they are poor swimmers. This is in contrast to other members of the family) Argulidae, who must leave their hosts to mate. After mating, females will adhere their eggs to structures or substrate in their environment while the host is at rest.

Species
As of December, 2022, there are 12 species recognised in the genus Chonopeltis:

Chonopeltis australis 
Chonopeltis brevis 
Chonopeltis congicus 
Chonopeltis elongatus 
Chonopeltis flaccifrons 
Chonopeltis fryeri 
Chonopeltis inermis 
Chonopeltis lisikili 
Chonopeltis liversedgi 
Chonopeltis meridionalis 
Chonopeltis minutus 
Chonopeltis schoutedeni

References

Crustacean genera